Miguel Ángel Ruiz García (born 5 January 1955) is a Spanish retired footballer who played as a central defender.

Club career
Ruiz was born in Toledo, Castile-La Mancha. He made his professional debut with Atlético Madrid, in 1977. From the 1979–80 season onwards he was an essential defensive unit for the Spanish capital club, rarely missing a La Liga fixture when healthy and helping the side to two major titles; he was part of the team that reached the final of the 1986 UEFA Cup Winners' Cup, appearing in the decisive match against FC Dynamo Kyiv (0–3 loss).

In the summer of 1987, Ruiz joined CD Málaga of the second level alongside Atlético teammate Clemente, going on to experience both one promotion and relegation with the Andalusians. He retired in 1991 at the age of 36, after contributing with only one game to Albacete Balompié's first-ever promotion to the top flight.

Subsequently, Ruiz worked as general manager with Atlético Madrid, Valencia CF, CD Tenerife and Albacete. In late November 2009 he left his post at the latter club, who was facing severe economic difficulties.

Honours
Atlético Madrid
Copa del Rey: 1984–85
Supercopa de España: 1985
UEFA Cup Winners' Cup runner-up: 1985–86

Málaga
Segunda División: 1987–88

Albacete
Segunda División: 1990–91

References

External links

1955 births
Living people
Sportspeople from Toledo, Spain
Spanish footballers
Footballers from Castilla–La Mancha
Association football defenders
La Liga players
Segunda División players
Tercera División players
Atlético Madrid B players
Atlético Madrid footballers
CD Málaga footballers
Albacete Balompié players